Marcílio Henrique Tavares Gonçalves (born 28 August 1991), better known as Ricky Tavares, is a Brazilian actor and model.

Life and career
Tavares was born in Brasília, and moved to Rio de Janeiro with his family during childhood. His siblings Juliana Xavier and Dharck Tavares are also actors. His cousin Tiago Santiago is a telenovela author and director.

Tavares studied at the drama school O Tablado. He began his artistic career in the theater, at age 16, playing the hunter Gaston in the play Beauty and the Beast. Still in the theater, he was in Pintando o Sete and The Wonderful Wizard of Oz. His first television appearance was in 2009 in the telenovela Promessas de Amor on RecordTV with the character Aurélio Pitini (Pit). In the same year, he played the character Rodrigo in TV Globo's Malhação ID. In 2013, the actor played his first leading role in the miniseries José do Egito.

Tavares joined the cast of several other soap operas, as well as Vidas em Jogo, A Terra Prometida, Jesus, Gênesis, among others. The artist also appears in the Netflix original series Maldivas.

For seven years, Tavares was in a relationship with actress Marcela Barrozo. The couple broke up in 2019.

Filmography

Television

Film

Internet

Theater

References

External links 

Living people
Actors from Brasília
Brazilian male television actors
Brazilian male telenovela actors
Brazilian male stage actors
Brazilian male models
Brazilian male child actors
1991 births